Beardstown may refer to:

 Beardstown, Illinois
 Beardstown Township, Cass County, Illinois
 Beardstown, Indiana
 Beardstown, Tennessee